The district of Mole Valley has more than 70 current and former places of worship: 56 buildings are in use by various Christian denominations and other religions, and a further 16 are no longer in religious use but survive in other uses or—in two cases—as ruins.  Mole Valley is one of 11 local government districts in the English county of Surrey—a small inland county south of London which is characterised by small market towns, ancient villages and 20th-century suburbs.

The latest census results show that the majority of residents are Christian.  Dorking, one of the district's two main towns, has a Muslim community centre and mosque, but all other places of worship serve Christian denominations.   The Church of England—the country's Established Church—is represented by the largest number of churches.  The Roman Catholic Church and the larger Protestant Nonconformist groups such as Methodists, Baptists and the United Reformed Church each have several buildings and congregations of their own.  Quakers, Christian Scientists, Plymouth Brethren and other smaller groups also have their own chapels and meeting rooms, mostly in Dorking and the other main town of Leatherhead.

English Heritage has awarded listed status to 29 current and three former places of worship in the district.  A building is defined as "listed" when it is placed on a statutory register of buildings of "special architectural or historic interest" in accordance with the Planning (Listed Buildings and Conservation Areas) Act 1990.  The Department for Culture, Media and Sport, a Government department, is responsible for this; English Heritage, a non-departmental public body, acts as an agency of the department to administer the process and advise the department on relevant issues.  There are three grades of listing status. Grade I, the highest, is defined as being of "exceptional interest"; Grade II* is used for "particularly important buildings of more than special interest"; and Grade II, the lowest, is used for buildings of "special interest".  As of February 2001, there were 5 Grade I-listed buildings, 44 with Grade II* status and 919 Grade II-listed buildings in Mole Valley.

Overview of the district

Mole Valley covers a  area in the centre of Surrey and had a population of 85,375 at the time of the United Kingdom Census 2011.  It is one of 11 local government areas in the county, which lies immediately south of London in southeast England.  The main centres of population are Dorking, centrally located within the district, and Leatherhead to the north, which is part of a continuous urban area incorporating Ashtead, Fetcham and Great Bookham.  The M25 motorway runs through them, several railway lines provide connections in all directions, and Gatwick Airport is just beyond the southeastern boundary of the district.  Nevertheless, it is mostly rural—more than 90% of the land is countryside, much of which is covered by the Surrey Hills AONB—and there are dozens of small villages.  Most have at least one place of worship—usually an Anglican parish church, and in some cases other chapels or meeting houses serving the Protestant Nonconformist denominations which grew in importance from the 18th century.  The main towns have a wider range of places of worship: Plymouth Brethren, Christian Scientists, the Elim Pentecostal Church and Jehovah's Witnesses are all represented, for example.  Roman Catholics are served by large churches in Dorking and Leatherhead and smaller modern buildings in Ashtead and Fetcham.  The Methodist church in Leatherhead recorded in the Methodist Statistical Returns published in 1947 survives, but the chapel at Capel is no longer in use and Dorking's Methodist chapel has been demolished; the congregation now share St Martin's Anglican church.

The oldest churches in the district have Saxon origins (i.e. 10th- or 11th-century); examples include Betchworth,  Fetcham and Wotton, each of which retain fragmentary evidence of this era.  (Even older material in the form of reused Roman rubble is visible at St Giles, Ashtead and at Fetcham.)  Norman churches extended or altered in the 13th century are common and across the county; in Mole Valley, Charlwood is a good example.  Work from later centuries generally consisted of extensions and rebuilds, although one new church was provided at Leigh in the 15th century.  Victorian restoration affected many churches, sometimes to the extent of completely rebuilding them (as at Buckland and Capel, both by Henry Woodyer).

Along with an enthusiasm for restoration, another characteristic of the area in the Victorian era was the provision of chapels of ease in the extensive ancient parishes and the formation of new parishes from parts of others.  Dorking expanded greatly in the 19th century, and the large parish of St Martin's Church was divided up as new churches were opened in the south of the town (St Paul, 1857) and at nearby North Holmwood (St John the Evangelist, 1875) and Pixham (St Mary the Virgin, 1903).  Similarly, Leatherhead's ancient parish church was supplemented by All Saints in the north of the town in 1889; St George was built in 1905 near Ashtead railway station as a chapel of ease to St Giles at Ashtead Park; and St Margaret, distant from Ockley village, had a chapel of ease (St John) on the village green from 1872 until its closure in the late 20th century.  In the same era, new churches were built in villages which had none before, and parishes were created for them.  Examples include Brockham Green (1848; originally in Betchworth parish), Coldharbour (1848; a parish was carved out of four others) and Westcott (1850; originally in Dorking parish).  Elsewhere, ruinous old churches were rebuilt or restored at Buckland, Headley, Oakwood Hill and other villages.  Churches built for specific purposes include the landmark hilltop St Barnabas' Church at Ranmore Common (1859; formerly in Great Bookham parish), provided for the Denbies Estate's owners and employees, and Holy Trinity at Forest Green (1897; formerly in Abinger parish)—built not only to serve villagers but to act as a memorial to a man who was killed in an accident.

Building materials vary, but many churches are built of local stone.  Brownish Bargate stone from the southwest of the county—"tougher, coarser and more durable than Reigate Stone" (also known as firestone)—was used at Buckland, Capel and the Roman Catholic church in Dorking.  Among the churches with firestone walls are Brockham (in which it is combined with limestone dressings, giving a polychromatic effect) and Oakwood Hill.  Also common, especially on the oldest churches, is flint.  This was usually used on its own; the chequerboard pattern of flint and stone squares common in other parts of England is seen at only two Surrey churches, both in Mole Valley: Leatherhead and Mickleham.  At the latter, clunch is the other part of the chequerboard pattern.  Clunch is also used at Betchworth, along with chalk; and that material (quarried extensively in east Surrey) is also found in the walls of the church at Oakwood Hill and internally at Fetcham and Great Bookham.  Ashlar formed from the soft, easily workable stone of the Upper Greensand beds, was commonly used for dressings, quoins and similar.  Horsham Stone, a type of sandstone, is often used as a tiling material on roofs.  Some places of worship are entirely different in materials and origins, though.  A converted cattle shed donated by Sir Benjamin Collins Brodie, 1st Baronet of Broome Park serves as a gospel hall in Betchworth; a timber-framed barn in Westhumble is now used as a chapel of ease to nearby Mickleham's parish church; and Providence Chapel at Charlwood was transported to its isolated site in 1816 from Horsham, where it had been used as an officers' mess during the Napoleonic Wars.  The remarkable building, which with its open verandah and white-painted wooden walls "would not be out of place in the remotest part of East Kentucky" in the words of Ian Nairn and Nikolaus Pevsner, served Independent Calvinists and Strict Baptists at various times, but  is up for sale.

Although most of the former places of worship in the district closed because of falling attendances, the Hampstead Road Church faced the opposite problem.  Built for Plymouth Brethren in 1863, it later developed an Open Brethren/Evangelical character, and by the early 21st century the congregation had outgrown the chapel.  Under the name The Nower Church they began worshipping in a school in July 2010, and the old chapel was deregistered in November 2011.

Religious affiliation
According to the United Kingdom Census 2011, 85,375 people lived in the district of Mole Valley.  Of these, 64.3% identified themselves as Christian, 0.78% were Muslim, 0.66% were Hindu, 0.39% were Buddhist, 0.25% were Jewish, 0.1% were Sikh, 0.39% followed another religion, 25.2% claimed no religious affiliation and 7.9% did not state their religion.  The proportion of Christians was much higher than the 59.38% in England as a whole; and the proportions of people who followed other religions or no religion or who did not answer this census question were similar to those recorded in England overall (0.43%, 24.74% and 7.18% respectively).  Islam, Judaism, Hinduism, Sikhism and Buddhism had a much lower following in the district than in the country overall: in 2011, 5.02% of people in England were Muslim, 1.52% were Hindu, 0.79% were Sikh, 0.49% were Jewish and 0.45% were Buddhist.

Administration

Anglican churches

Administratively, Mole Valley district is split between two Church of England dioceses: the Anglican Diocese of Southwark, the seat of which is Southwark Cathedral in London, and the Diocese of Guildford, whose cathedral is at Guildford in Surrey.  The Diocese of Southwark's Reigate Deanery, part of the Reigate Archdeaconry and the Croydon Episcopal Area, administers the churches at Betchworth, Brockham Green, Buckland, Charlwood and Leigh.  The churches in Guildford Diocese are covered by three deaneries—Dorking, Epsom and Leatherhead—all of which are in turn part of the Archdeaconry of Dorking.  The churches at Abinger Common, Capel, Coldharbour, Dorking (St Martin and St Paul), Forest Green, Newdigate, North Holmwood, Oakwood Hill, Ockley, Pixham, Ranmore Common, South Holmwood, Westcott and Wotton are in Dorking Deanery; Box Hill and Headley are covered by Epsom Deanery; and Leatherhead Deanery administers Ashtead's two churches (St George and St Giles), the two in Leatherhead (St Mary and St Nicholas and All Saints) and those at Fetcham, Great Bookham, Little Bookham, Mickleham and Westhumble.

Roman Catholic churches
All four Roman Catholic churches in Mole Valley—at Ashtead, Dorking, Fetcham and Leatherhead—are administered by Epsom Deanery, one of 13 deaneries in the Roman Catholic Diocese of Arundel and Brighton, whose cathedral is at Arundel in West Sussex.

Other denominations
Crossways Community Baptist Church in Dorking is part of the Gatwick Network of the South Eastern Baptist Association, and Ashtead and Bookham Baptist Churches are within the association's Guildford Network.  Mount Zion Chapel, a Strict Baptist place of worship in Leatherhead, is affiliated with the Gospel Standard movement; and Dorking Baptist Chapel (originally Strict Baptist) maintains links with GraceNet UK, an association of Reformed Evangelical Christian churches and organisations. The Methodist congregations meeting in Leatherhead and in the shared Anglican and Methodist church in Dorking are covered by the eight-church Dorking & Horsham Methodist Circuit.  The Southern Synod, one of 13 synods of the United Reformed Church in the United Kingdom, administers that denomination's churches at Dorking, Great Bookham and Leatherhead.

Current places of worship

Former places of worship

Notes

References

Bibliography

 (Available online in 14 parts ; Guide to abbreviations on page 6 )

Mole Valley
Mole Valley
Mole Valley
Churches
Lists of buildings and structures in Surrey